Lover Girl is the first studio album by the dancehall artist Lady Saw.

Track listing
 Man in My Life  
 To Sir with Love 
Love Is What We Want   
Baby Face   
We Need Love  
Find a Good Man  
Hardcore 
Heads of Government   
Wife and Sweetheart   
Bare as You Dare 
Welding Torch   
Bad Rooster   
Bad Inna Bed  
Stab Out the Meat [Remix] 
Informer   
Can't Run Competition

References

1994 debut albums
Lady Saw albums